This is a list of broadcast television stations that are licensed in the U.S. state of Kansas.

Full-power stations
VC refers to the station's PSIP virtual channel. RF refers to the station's physical RF channel.

Defunct full-power stations
 Channel 16: KEDD-TV - Wichita (8/15/1953-4/30/1956)
 Channel 34: KSLN-TV (first incarnation) - ABC - Salina (1/2/1962-4/23/1963)
 Channel 34: KSLN-TV (second incarnation) - ABC - Salina (8/1/1964-11/1/1965)

LPTV stations
VC refers to the station's PSIP virtual channel. RF refers to the station's physical RF channel. AC refers to an analog station

Translators

Kansas
Television stations
 
Television stations